María Luz Morales Godoy (La Coruña, 1889 - Barcelona, 1980) was a pioneering Spanish cultural journalist and writer of the 20th century.

She was the first woman in Spain to direct a national newspaper, La Vanguardia, which she managed during the period of 1936 and 1937 at the beginning of the Guerra Civil Española.

In 1939, she was detained for 40 days and was professionally unable to work because of Francoism. With the retorno de la democracia, she continued her work, collaborating with Diario de Barcelona until her death, at the age of 91. 
She was instrumental in the incorporation of women for journalistic and literary activity in España del siglo XX.

Awards and honours 
 1956 - Orden de las Palmas Académicas
 1963 - Premio Nacional de Teatro (1962)
 1971 - Lazo de Isabel la Católica

Selected works 

 Parientes y trastos viejos (inédita)
 Trovas de otros tiempos, 1928
 Libros, mujeres y niños, 1928
 Las románticas, 1930
 Edison, 1934
 Romance de media noche (with Elisabeth Mulder), 1935
 Julio César, 1936
 Madame Curie, 1936
 Alejandro Magno, 1936
 Alguien a quien conocí, 1937
 Tres historias de amor en la Revolución francesa, 1942
 María Antonieta, 1943
 El mundo de las hormigas, 1948
 El Cine: historia ilustrada del séptimo arte, 1950
 Hazañas del Cid, 1951. , 
 Enciclopedia del hogar, 1952
 Rosalinda en la ventana, 1954
 Balcón al Atlántico: (otra novela sin héroe), 1955
 Balcón al Mediterráneo, 1955
 Historias del décimo círculo, 1962
 Libro de oro de la poesía en lengua castellana, 1970

References

Bibliography 
 María Ángeles Cabré (2017). María Luz Morales. Pionera del periodismo (Libros de Vanguardia).

External links 
 ¿A quién votarán nuestras mujeres?,  La Vanguardia, 1933. (in Spanish)
 ¿Qué deben leer las mujeres? Gaziel rsponde a Morales: ¡Pues lo mismo que los hombres! La Vanguardia, 1927. (in Spanish)
 Las mujeres de la revolución, La Vanguardia, 1933. (in Spanish)

People from A Coruña
Spanish film critics
Writers from Galicia (Spain)
20th-century Spanish women writers
1889 births
1980 deaths
Women writers from Galicia (Spain)
Spanish women journalists
20th-century Spanish journalists